Keolis Downer is a joint venture between Keolis, the largest private sector French transport group, and Downer Rail, an Australian railway engineering company, that operates bus and tram services in Australia.

History

In June 2009, the Victorian government awarded to Keolis Downer the franchise to operate the Melbourne tram network in Melbourne, Australia. for eight years commencing on 30 November 2009. In September 2017, having substantially met performance criteria, the franchise was extended until 30 November 2024. Keolis Downer continues to operate the Melbourne tram network under the Yarra Trams name, that had been used by the previous operator TransdevTSL.

On 21 July 2014, Keolis Downer commenced operating the G:link tram operation on the Gold Coast. In March 2015, Keolis Downer purchased bus operator Australian Transit Enterprises which operated the Hornibrook Bus Lines, LinkSA, Path Transit and SouthLink operations with 930 buses.

Keolis Downer trading as Newcastle Transport took over the Newcastle Buses & Ferries operation on 1 July 2017, and commenced operating the Newcastle Light Rail in February 2019.

On 31 January 2021, Keolis Downer commenced an eight-year contract to operate the Adelaide Metro rail network.

On 31 October 2021, Keolis Downer Northern Beaches commenced an eight-year contract to operate Region 8 (Northern Beaches and Lower North Shore) of the Sydney Metropolitan Bus Service Contracts. Keolis Downer has already operated on-demand services in the area since November 2017.

Operations

New South Wales
Newcastle Transport - Bus services in Newcastle, Stockton ferry service and Newcastle Light Rail services
Keolis Downer, Northern Beaches - Region 8 contract
Keoride - Northern Beaches on-demand bus service

Queensland
G:link - light rail in Gold Coast
Hornibrook Bus Lines - bus services in the Redcliffe Peninsula

South Australia
LinkSA - in the Adelaide Hills, Barossa Valley, Mid-Murray, Murraylands and Victor Harbor regions
SouthLink - bus services in Adelaide under its Adelaide Metro Hills contract
Adelaide Metro rail services

Western Australia
Path Transit - bus services in Perth and Geraldton.

Victoria
Yarra Trams - trams in Melbourne

References

Companies based in Sydney
Keolis
Transport companies established in 2009
Australian companies established in 2009
Multinational joint-venture companies
Bus companies of Australia